The Reformed Catholic Church of Venezuela (Anglican Rite) is a member jurisdiction of the Latin-American Anglican Church, a part of the global Orthodox Anglican Communion, and has received recognition from the Conservative Anglican Church of North America, a small United States-based group.  It is therefore not a part of the Anglican Communion or the Roman Catholic Church.

History
The jurisdiction was inaugurated in June 2008 by Roman Catholics, Anglicans, and Lutherans who rejected (among other things) the Roman Catholic ban on married priests.  News reports claimed church leadership expressed support for some of the policies of President Hugo Chávez.

Several high-ranking prelates in the Roman Catholic Church have criticized the new jurisdiction for attempting to divide the larger Catholic Church, and asked Roman Catholics to avoid the church.

References

External links
Website of the Orthodox Anglican Communion

Christian organizations established in 2008
Anglican denominations established in the 21st century
Churches in Venezuela
Independent Catholic denominations